Emre Akbaba (born 4 October 1992) is a Turkish professional footballer who plays as a midfielder for the Turkish club Adana Demirspor in the Süper Lig.

Club career

Galatasaray

2018–19 season
In the statement made by Galatasaray on 18 August 2018, an agreement was reached with Emre Akbaba and his club Alanyaspor on the transfer of the player. Accordingly, a transfer fee of 4,000,000 Euros will be paid to the former club of the football player. An agreement has been reached with the player himself for 3 seasons, starting with the 2018–19 football season. Accordingly, a net 1.750.000 Euro fixed transfer fee will be paid to the player for each football season.

2019–20 season
On 11 May 2019, in the 32nd week of the Süper Lig, Galatasaray was the guest of Çaykur Rizespor, while the yellow-red team suffered a sad injury in the second half of the match.

Akbaba, who was substituted for Ryan Donk in the 61st minute, remained on the ground after Braian Samudio's intervention in the 67th minute. There was a great sadness in the field as the right foot of the football player was broken.

2020–21 season
On 15 January 2020, Galatasaray Technical Director Fatih Terim took Akbaba, who returned to the field after 8 months, to the field as the captain in the Çaykur Rizespor match. The Turkish national player brought the score to 1–1 with the goal he scored in the 39th minute of the fight.

2021–22 season
A new 2-year contract was signed between Akbaba and Galatasaray, whose contract expired on 4 July 2021.

Alanyaspor (loan)
On 4 July 2021, it was announced that an agreement was reached on the temporary transfer of Galatasaray Akbaba to Alanyaspor until the end of the 2021–22 season.

Adana Demirspor
He signed a 2+1 year contract with Adana Demirspor on 8 September 2022. It has been announced that a transfer fee of 500,000 Euros will be paid to the Galatasaray club for this transfer.

International career
Emre was born in Montfermeil within a French family of Turkish descent. Emre made one appearance for the Turkey national football B team in a 2–2 (3–5) win over the Italy U21s.

Career statistics

Club

International

International goals
Scores and results list Turkey's goal tally first.

Honours
Galatasaray
 Süper Lig: 2018–19
 Turkish Cup:  2018–19
 Turkish Super Cup: 2019

Personal life
Akbaba married Yasemin İnce in November 2016.

References

1992 births
Living people
People from Montfermeil
Turkish footballers
Turkey B international footballers
Turkey international footballers
Association football midfielders
French footballers
French people of Turkish descent
Süper Lig players
TFF First League players
Alanyaspor footballers
Antalyaspor footballers
Galatasaray S.K. footballers
Footballers from Seine-Saint-Denis
Adana Demirspor footballers